The 1928 German Ice Hockey Championship was the 12th season of the German Ice Hockey Championship, the national championship of Germany. Berliner Schlittschuhclub won the championship by defeating SC Riessersee in the final.

First round

Group A

Group B

3rd place

Final

References

External links
German ice hockey standings 1912-1932

Ger
German Ice Hockey Championship seasons
Ice hockey